Panchi Bora is an Indian television actress and model from Assam. She plays lead roles in the series Kayamath and Kitni Mast Hai Zindagi, before working in the Telugu film industry.

Life and career
Panchi Bora hails from Assam. Her father is a retired army officer who settled in Pune after his retirement. She wanted to become a lawyer and enrolled at the ILS Law College in Pune. During her first year in college, she appeared in commercials and television advertisements. She worked alongside her mother in a Tata Indicom commercial, and got a break in a Cadbury advertisement.

Ekta Kapoor, head of Balaji Telefilms, saw the advertisement and asked her to audition for Kitni Mast Hai Zindagi, the first ever soap to be aired on MTV. She played a radio jockey, Ananya Puri, one of the main leads in the series. After Kitni Mast Hai Zindagi, she took a break and decided to complete her graduation. She quit her law studies and enrolled at the Fergusson College, Pune, where she pursued a Bachelor of Arts degree. Ekta Kapoor then approached her again for a role in Balaji Telefilms' series Kayamath. Bora said that initially she was not interested in the role but that after Ekta Kapoor persisted and narrated the script to her, she took it up as she found it interesting. She played the central role of Prachi in Kayamath, who according to Bora was "a simple girl, very shy and attached to her family" and "unlike me in real life". After Kayamath she had a break (2009–2012) then she came back with Bid Aai also on STAR Plus. In 2010, while in Russia, she was selected to play the female lead in an English-language Russian TV production titled The Hindu – The Indian. She played Maya, an Indian girl, who she described as "extremely spiritual" and shot for it in parts of North India and Moscow. In 2012, she made an appearance in Gumrah: End of Innocence in which she played a fun loving girl Neelam who aspires to be a designer.

She made her feature film debut in the 2011 Telugu film Aakasame Haddu. About her performance in the film, The Hindu wrote, "Panchi Bora is gorgeous and slips easily into the role of a two timer". Her second film was Uu Kodathara? Ulikki Padathara?, in which she was paired with Nandamuri Balakrishna. In Yamini Chandrasekhar she played the titular character, Yamini, an archaeology student.

Filmography

Television

See also 

 List of Indian television actresses

References

External links

Living people
Indian television actresses
Actresses from Pune
21st-century Indian actresses
Actresses in Hindi cinema
Actresses in Assamese cinema
Actresses from Assam
Female models from Assam
Bigg Boss (Hindi TV series) contestants
Year of birth missing (living people)